The 1979 World Rally Championship was the seventh season of the Fédération Internationale de l'Automobile (FIA) World Rally Championship (WRC). The season consisted of 12 rallies, one more than the previous year. The addition marked the return to New Zealand, an event which would remain on the schedule through today.

1979 marked the first season for the new World Rally Championship for Drivers. This successor to the preceding FIA Cup for Rally Drivers was aligned with the World Rally Championship for Manufacturers. Both championships used the same schedule of events for accumulating points toward the titles, although the point awarding methods were different for each. Manufacturers continued to receive points under the system adopted in 1977, in which points were garnered for both placement overall and placement within the car's group. Only the top finishing car from each manufacturer would garner points, and regardless of group finish, an overall finish of 10th or better was required to obtain points. Drivers were awarded points on the former system, simply based on overall finish, from 20 points for 1st place to 1 point for 10th place.

After several years of competitive but ultimately unsuccessful attempts to seize the championship, Ford finally gathered its first WRC manufacturer's title. A strong season which included five rally wins gave it the edge over new challenger Datsun, whose 160J (Violet) proved successful, and former champion Fiat. Ford's fortune would be short-lived however, and despite determined and competitive participation in WRC events, 1979 would be the company's sole WRC title until their return to victory in 2006.

The competition for the first WRC driver's title was extremely close, and ultimately was decided by the two contenders placing first and second in the final rally of the season. The final difference between the winner, Swede Björn Waldegård, and the runner-up, Finn Hannu Mikkola, was only a single point.



Events

Championship for manufacturers

Championship for drivers

Teams

See also 
 1979 in sports

External links

 FIA World Rally Championship 1979 at ewrc-results.com

World Rally Championship
World Rally Championship seasons